Ferris Lake is a lake located east of Powley Place, New York. Fish species present in the lake are yellow perch, sunfish, and brown bullhead. There is a trail access from Powley Place via private lands. Detouring off the trail or camping on the trail is not allowed.

References

Lakes of New York (state)
Lakes of Hamilton County, New York